Michelle Kelly may refer to
Michelle Kelly (marine scientist), also known as Michelle Kelly-Borges and Kelly-Borges
Michelle Kelly (skeleton racer) (born 1974), Canadian Olympic skeleton racer
Michelle Kelly (pentathlete) (born c. 1978), American pentathlete

See also
Laura Michelle Kelly (born 1981), English actress and singer